The 1946 Kansas gubernatorial election was held on November 5, 1946. Republican nominee Frank Carlson defeated Democratic nominee Harry Hines Woodring with 53.50% of the vote.

General election

Candidates
Major party candidates 
Frank Carlson, Republican
Harry H. Woodring, Democratic

Other candidates
David C. White, Prohibition
Harry Graber, Socialist

Results

References

Gubernatorial
1946
Kansas